KASL (1240 AM) is a commercial radio station licensed to Newcastle, Wyoming. The station carries a country music format, and broadcasts a 1,000 watt signal. It signed on in 1953.

Weekdays, Kevin Senger from 6:00 AM to 10:00 AM.   Otherwise, music is provided by Mainstream Country from Westwood One.  Weekday features include "Tradio," "What's Happening" and The Mike Huckabee Report.

KASL has a year-round sports presence, with coverage of Newcastle High School sports, Wyoming Cowboys football and basketball and Wyoming Cowgirls basketball, and the Denver Broncos.

The station's 1,000 watt signal reaches most of the surrounding area fairly well, and also reaches into parts of western South Dakota.

References

External links
FCC History Cards for KASL

ASL
Country radio stations in the United States
Radio stations established in 1953
1953 establishments in Wyoming